Treat Conrad Huey and Vasek Pospisil were the defending champions but Huey decided not to participate.
Pospisil played alongside Adil Shamasdin, reaching the quarterfinals.
Tomasz Bednarek and Olivier Charroin won the title, defeating Jaan-Frederik Brunken and Stefan Seifert 6–3, 6–2 in the final.

Seeds

Draw

Draw

References
 Main Draw

Challenger Banque Nationale de Rimouski
Challenger de Drummondville